The Echinacea are a superorder of sea urchins. They are distinguished by the presence of a rigid test, with ten buccal plates around the mouth, and solid spines. Unlike some other sea urchins, they also possess gills. The group is a large one, with species found worldwide.

Echinacea are part of Animalia (kingdom), Echinodermata (phylum), Echinozoa (subphylum), Echinoidea (class), Euechinoidea (subclass), Carinacea (infraclass).

Child taxa
According to World Register of Marine Species: 
 Order Arbacioida (Gregory, 1900) -- 1 family and 2 fossiles
 Order Camarodonta (Jackson, 1912)
 Infraorder Echinidea (Kroh & Smith, 2010) -- 5 families
 Infraorder Temnopleuridea (Kroh & Smith, 2010) -- 2 families and 2 fossiles
 Order Stomopneustoida (Kroh & Smith, 2010) -- 2 families and 1 fossile
 Family Glyphopneustidae  Smith & Wright, 1993 †

References

 
 

 
Extant Early Jurassic first appearances